= Operation Marne Courageous =

Date	16 November 2007
Location	Baghdad, Iraq

Belligerents
United States	Iraqi Insurgency

Casualties and losses
None reported	

Operation Marne Courageous was a military operation in 2007 conducted by the United States 101st Airborne Division and Iraqi Security Forces between 16 - 19 November 2007 in Anbar province, Iraq.

The operation involved 750 troops and 70 civilians, supported by helicopter gunships, who occupied the villages of Owesat and Betra, approximately 15 miles from Baghdad. The objective of the operation was to secure the western side of the Euphrates, an area formerly occupied by insurgents. A permanent base was constructed, Patrol Base Kemple, to maintain security in the area. The patrol base was named after Corporal Andrew Kemple, who was killed on 12 February 2006 while serving in Iraq and would be commanded by Captain Terry N. Hilderbrand.

== Military units involved ==
US forces reported to be involved were

- 3rd brigade, 101st Airborne Division / 4th Battalion, 3rd Aviation Regiment 3rd Infantry Division

== Casualties ==
No casualties were reported during the operation.
